The Santo Domingo Dominican Republic Temple is the 99th operating temple of the Church of Jesus Christ of Latter-day Saints (LDS Church). It was the first temple to be built in the church's Caribbean area.

Santo Domingo is the Dominican Republic's capital city. Founded in 1496, it is the oldest European settlement existing in the New World. In 1978 the Dominican Republic was opened to Mormon missionaries. By 1986, membership had grown to eleven thousand and in 1998, LDS Church membership reached sixty thousand. Before the temple was built in the Dominican Republic, members of the church traveled to Peru, Guatemala, or the U.S. state of Florida to attend a temple.

The temple was announced on December 4, 1993. On August 18, 1996, Richard G. Scott of the Quorum of the Twelve presided over the groundbreaking, marking the beginning of construction. When construction was completed, a public open house was held from August 26 to September 9, 2000, attracting nearly forty thousand people. Over ten thousand church members from the Dominican Republic and their neighbors from Haiti, Puerto Rico, and other islands witnessed the dedication of the temple on September 17, 2000 by LDS Church president Gordon B. Hinckley.

The Santo Domingo Dominican Republic Temple is located in the western part of the city. It is built on a rise that has kept it dry when other parts of the city were flooded. The site is adorned with trees and overlooks the Caribbean Sea.

Temple district
The temple supports church members in most of the Caribbean.  As of April 2020, the temple district comprises the 27 stakes and 14 districts headquartered in the Dominican Republic, Puerto Rico, Trinidad and Tobago, Barbados, Cuba, Aruba, Saint Vincent and the Grenadines, and Guadeloupe. Church units in Haiti, The Bahamas, and Jamaica are assigned to temples in Port-au-Prince, Florida, or Panama, although church members may attend any temple in the world.

Services
Workers at this temple are able to provide services in the following languages commonly spoken in the temple district:
 Dutch
 English
 French
 Haitian Creole
 Spanish

As most workers at this temple are Spanish-speaking Dominicans, patrons requiring services in a language other than Spanish would be well-advised to notify the temple before arriving.

Adjacent to the temple is a hostel operated by the church. Its intent is to provide overnight accommodations to patrons who cannot return to their homes the same day they attend the temple. A kitchen and dining area are available for the use by patrons, but the hostel does not include a cafeteria (though restaurants and grocery stores are within walking distance).

Controversy
In 2012, a researcher revealed that Anne Frank had been baptized for the dead in the Santo Domingo Dominican Republic Temple, in violation of a 1995 agreement between the church and Jewish groups that the church would no longer posthumously baptize Holocaust victims. In response, the church stated that the member that submitted the name for baptism would lose their submission privileges and that other disciplinary action would be considered.

See also

 Comparison of temples of The Church of Jesus Christ of Latter-day Saints
 List of temples of The Church of Jesus Christ of Latter-day Saints
 List of temples of The Church of Jesus Christ of Latter-day Saints by geographic region
 Temple architecture (Latter-day Saints)
 The Church of Jesus Christ of Latter-day Saints in the Dominican Republic

Notes

References

External links
 
 Official Santo Domingo Dominican Republic Temple page
 Santo Domingo Dominican Republic Temple page

The Church of Jesus Christ of Latter-day Saints in the Dominican Republic
Churches in Santo Domingo
21st-century Latter Day Saint temples
Temples (LDS Church) completed in 2000
Temples (LDS Church) in Latin America
Temples (LDS Church) in North America
2000 establishments in the Dominican Republic